Parinayam (English: Wedding) is a Malayalam language period drama film, directed by Hariharan and written by M. T. Vasudevan Nair. The key characters are played by Mohini,  Manoj K. Jayan and Vineeth. The film also has a cast of character artists including Thilakan, Nedumudi Venu, Oduvil Unnikrishnan, Jagathy Sreekumar, Sukumari, Jagannatha Varma, Valsala Menon, Bindu Panicker, Bahadoor and Shanthi Krishna. 

It won four National Film Awards (Best Screenplay, Best Film on Other Social Issues, Best Music Direction and Special Jury Award for Cinematography), also won several Kerala State Film Awards and Two Filmfare Awards South. This film deals with the mental and physical agony that a young Namboothiri widow had to undergo for losing her chastity. Parinayam is loosely inspired from the life of Kuriyedathu Thathri and revolves around Smārthavichāram — a ritualistic trial for adultery practiced among the Brahmins of Kerala. It is often regarded as a classic in Malayalam cinema.

Plot
Unnimaya (Mohini), a young girl is married to Palakunnath Namboothiri (Jagannatha Varma), a man in his sixties. She is his fourth wife. Unnimaya is an educated girl hailing from Kizhakkedath Mana, a progressive family in Kerala. Due to various social and economic factors, she is compelled to marry Palakunnath Namboothiri, a rich gentleman. Coming from a progressive household, Unnimaya finds it hard to adjust with the severe orthodox practices at her new home. The sudden death of her husband brings her face-to-face with the customary rituals practiced among Namboothiri community towards widowed women. She realizes that her widowhood makes her almost a shunned individual - one who cannot participate in any celebrations, or even attend any music/dance events or performances. Kunjunni Namboothiri (Manoj K. Jayan), the elder son of Palakkunath, is the only person who shows compassion and support towards her. Kunjunni is actively involved in reformation among the Namboothiris and is considered as a rebel among the orthodox community. Unnimaya meets Madhavan (Vineeth), an upcoming Kathakali artist, and falls in love with him. They share some intimate moments, and later Unnimaya realizes that she is pregnant. The orthodox Namboothiri community is shocked when it learns about her pregnancy and decides to excommunicate her through Smarthavicharam. A group of senior Namboothiris, under the leadership of Moothedath Bhattathiri (Thilakan), conducts a series of rituals, first to extract the name of the one who impregnated her, and then later, to throw her out of the community. Unnimaya expects Madhavan to come save her, but he is unable to muster the courage to rescue her. Realizing that he is a coward and that she cannot expect him to deliver her out of the situation, Unnimaya decides to stand up to the orthodox Namboothiris. She answers their questions with clarity and confidence, angering them further. Ultimately, the decision is made to excommunicate her, and all the necessary rituals are completed. Kunjunni arrives as her savior. He gives her shelter at his home. The progressive Yogakshema Sabha, that he is part of, finds his ways too bohemian and dismisses him from the group. Madhavan, realizing his mistake, arrives to accept Unnimaya, but now she shows him the door declaring that he is not the father of her unborn child and that the fathers are Arjuna, Bhima, Nala (the heroic characters performed by Madhavan as part of his dance performances). Unnimaya involves herself in social service and becomes a Congress volunteer deciding to do something for the downtrodden society.

Cast
 Mohini  as Unnimaya Antharjanam 
 Manoj K. Jayan as Kunjunni
 Vineeth as Madhavan
 Ravi Menon as Krishnan
 Thilakan as Moothedam
 Nedumudi Venu as Aphan Namboothiri
 Jagathy Sreekumar as Mullassery
 Oduvil Unnikrishnan as Othikkan
 T. P. Madhavan
 Anoop Raja as Vasudevan
 KPAC Premachandran as Thekkumthala Govindan
 Sukumari as Kunjikavu
 Shanthi Krishna as Mathu
 Bahadoor as Kizhakkedam
 Jagannatha Varma as Palakkunnam
 Anila Sreekumar as Nanikutty
 Santhakumari as Madhavan's Mother
 Bindu Panicker as cheriya Athemaru
 Valsala Menon as Valiya Athemaru
Babu Swamy
Premachandran
 Sreejaya

Soundtrack

The acclaimed soundtrack of this movie was composed by maestro Bombay Ravi for which the acclaimed lyrics were penned by Yusufali Kechery. All the songs of this movie were instant hits.

Awards
 National Film Awards
 Best Film on Other Social Issues -  G. P. Vijayakumar
 Best Screenplay - M. T. Vasudevan Nair
 Best Music Direction - Bombay Ravi
 Special Mention for Cinematography - S. Kumar

 Kerala State Film Awards
 Best Film -  G. P. Vijayakumar
 Best Screenplay - M. T. Vasudevan Nair
 Best Male Playback Singer - K. J. Yesudas
 Best Female Playback Singer - K. S. Chithra
 Kerala State Film Award for Best Lyrics - Yusuf Ali kechery

External links

References

1994 films
1990s Malayalam-language films
Films scored by Ravi
Films with screenplays by M. T. Vasudevan Nair
Films directed by Hariharan
Indian drama films
Films about widowhood in India
Films shot in Ottapalam
Films shot in Palakkad
Films whose writer won the Best Original Screenplay National Film Award
Best Film on Other Social Issues National Film Award winners